Karen Lozano is a Mexican American researcher who is the Professor and Julia Beecherl Endowed Chair Mechanical Engineering at the University of Texas System. She studies carbon nanofiber-reinforced thermoplastic composites, and is the Director of the University of Texas Rio Grande Valley Nanotechnology Center of Excellence. She was elected Fellow of the National Academy of Inventors in 2020 and the National Academy of Engineering in 2022.

Early life and education 
Lozano was born in Mexico. Her mother was a seamstress. She studied mechanical engineering at the University of Monterrey and the year she graduated, she was the only woman to earn a degree in mechanical engineering. Researchers from Rice University visited Monterrey as part of an outreach project, and recruited Lozano to join for a doctoral position. She was the first Latin American woman to earn a PhD from Rice.

Research and career 
Lozano joined the faculty at the University of Texas–Pan American, where she worked on new approach to mass-produce nano nanofibers. In 2012 she launched FibreRio, a company that could mass-produce cheap nanofibers from minimal quantities of material. Fiberio makes use of Cyclone ForceSpinning Systems, which uses centrifugal forces to pull nanofibers for industrial and medical applications. She took part in a roundtable discussion with Barack Obama about entrepreneurs in the United States.

In 2021, Lozano was awarded a National Science Foundation (NSF) award to build a partnership between the University of Texas Rio Grande Valley and University of Minnesota to create a materials science research center. The center looks to train undergraduate and graduate students from Hispanic backgrounds to pursue careers in materials science.

Awards and honors 
 2002 Most Promising Scientist Award Hispanic Engineer National Achievement Association Conference
 2011 University of Texas System Regents Teaching Award
 2018 Mexicanos Distinguidos Medal
 2018 Latina of Influence
 2019 Presidential Award for Excellence in Science, Mathematics, and Engineering Mentoring
 2020 Elected to the National Academy of Inventors

Selected publications

References 

Year of birth missing (living people)
Living people
Rice University alumni
University of Monterrey alumni
Fellows of the National Academy of Inventors
Members of the United States National Academy of Engineering
Mexican emigrants to the United States
Mechanical engineers
American women engineers
20th-century American engineers
21st-century American engineers
20th-century women engineers
21st-century women engineers